Trolla is a mountain in the Trollheimen mountain range in Sunndal Municipality in Møre og Romsdal county, Norway. The mountain is made up of several peaks along the ridge of the mountain:

The ridge continues northwards to the peak Skarfjellet.

See also
 List of peaks in Norway by prominence, Store Trolla is number 14.

References

Trolla
Sunndal